Élvis José de Lima (born November 5, 1985 in Camaragibe), is a Brazilian attacking midfielder. He currently plays for ABC.

Career
Born in Pernambuco state, Élvis began his career with local side Santa Cruz Futebol Clube. After graduating from the club's youth academy, he played for the club until 2010.

Élvis signed with Sport Clube Recife in 2011 on a free after playing with Santa Cruz. Shortly after, he returned to Salgueiro Atlético Clube where he had played on loan from Santa Cruz.

He transferred from Salgueiro to Mogi Mirim in 2015 to reinforce the club after their promotion from Serie C to Serie B. Mogi Mirim knocked out Salgueiro in the Serie C promotion playoffs that year.

References

External links
 

1985 births
Living people
Brazilian footballers
Brazilian expatriate footballers
Sportspeople from Pernambuco
Salgueiro Atlético Clube players
Santa Cruz Futebol Clube players
Campinense Clube players
Sport Club do Recife players
Paysandu Sport Club players
Agremiação Sportiva Arapiraquense players
ABC Futebol Clube players
Association football forwards